Louisvale Pirates (often misspelt as Louisville Pirates) are a football club from the town of Louisvale in the Northern Cape.

They were promoted from the Vodacom League in 2004.  In the 2004–05 season they were relegated from the National First Division.

References 

Soccer clubs in South Africa
National First Division clubs